Eliot Varnum Graves (September 24, 1882 – 1967) was an American football player and coach of football and basketball.  He served as the head football coach at Lawrence University in Appleton, Wisconsin from 1906 to 1908, compiling a record of 11–10.  Graves was also the head basketball coach at Lawrence from 1907 to 1909, tallying a mark of 13–6. Graves played football at the University of Nebraska–Lincoln in 1903. He was the son of Episcopalian bishop Anson Rogers Graves.

Head coaching record

Football

References

External links
 

1882 births
1967 deaths
American football halfbacks
Basketball coaches from Vermont
Lawrence Vikings football coaches
Lawrence Vikings men's basketball coaches
Nebraska Cornhuskers football players
People from Bennington, Vermont
Players of American football from Vermont